Yoo or You, or sometimes Ryu or Ryoo is the English transcription of several Korean surnames written as  or  in hangul. As of 2000, roughly a million people are surnamed Yoo in South Korea, making up approximately 2% of the population. Of those, the most common is Ryu (Hanja: ,), with more than six hundred thousand holders, whereas Yoo (Hanja: ,) accounts for about one hundred thousand.

Some of these characters are used to write the Chinese surnames Liu ( or ) and Yu().

Notable  (Ryu) clans include the Munhwa Ryu clan and the Pungsan Ryu.

History   
In Korea, the Yoo lineage traces to the Xia, Han, and Joseon dynasties. Holders of the surname Yoo had a reputation for charity and diligence.

The largest Ryu (which is a separate clan from Yoo, but pronounced differently), the Munhwa Ryu, was founded by a man named Ch’a Tal. Ch’a's fifth great-grandfather had been involved in an attempt to overthrow the Silla king. To avoid prosecution, the ancestor fled to Munhwa and changed his surname, first to that of his maternal grandmother, Yang, and then to Ryoo. Many years later, Ch’a Tal assisted Wang Kŏn to establish the Koryŏ Kingdom. Ch’a was recognized for his support and was rewarded accordingly. However, the historic claims that the Ch'a clans are derived from the same progenitor as Ryu Ch'a-dal have been disproven. The Munhwa Ryoo clan, along with the Andong Kwŏn clan, possess one of Korea's oldest clan genealogies. Only the character  is commonly pronounced Ryu or Ryoo. (See Munhwa Ryoo) The surname "Ryu" comes from the character meaning willow tree. Hence, the lineage is also sometimes called "willow Ryu".

Notable individuals

Historic  
 Ryu Cha-dal (b. circa 880)
 Yu Seong-won (d. 1456), one of the Six martyred ministers during the Joseon period.
 Yu Eung-bu (d. 1456), of the Gigye Yoo clan originally from Pohang, one of the Six martyred ministers during the Joseon period.
 Ryu Seong-ryong (1542–1607). Well known for his JingBiRok.
 Yu Hyeong-won (1622–1673). He was an early silhak scholar.
 Yu Deuk-gong (1749–1807), historian about Balhae.
 Yu Kil-chun (1856–1914), of the Gigye Yoo clan originally from Pohang. Independence activist.
 Il-han New (1895–1971). Independence activist and entrepreneur.
 Ryu Gwan-sun (1902–1920). She was a Korean independence activist.

Contemporary 
 Yoo Ah-in (born Uhm Hong-sik), South Korean actor, creative director, and gallerist
 Yu Anjin, South Korean poet
 Yoo Ara, South Korean actress and singer, former member of girl group Hello Venus
 Yoo Byung-eun (1941-2014), South Korean businessman, inventor, and photographer
 Yoo Byung-hoon South Korean Paralympian athlete
 Yoo Byung-jae, South Korean television personality, actor and screenwriter.
 Yoo Byung-ok, South Korean football defender who played for South Korea in the 1986 FIFA World Cup
 Yoo Byung-soo, South Korean football striker
 Yoo Chae-ran, South Korean badminton player
 Yoo Chae-yeong (1973–2014), South Korean actress, singer and radio host
 Yoo Chan-wook (better known as Be'O), South Korean rapper and songwriter
 Yoo Chang-hyuk, South Korean professional Go player
 Yoo Chang-soon (1918-2010), Prime Minister of South Korea from 4 January 1982 to 24 June 1982 and governor of the Bank of Korea from 1961 to 1962.
 Yoo Da-in, South Korean actress
 Yoo Dae-hyun, South Korean footballer
 Yoo Dae-soon, South Korean former footballer 
 Yoo Dong-geun, South Korean actor
 Yoo Dong-kwan, South Korean former footballer
 Yoo Dong-min, South Korean footballer
 Yoo Eun-hae, South Korean politician who served as the Minister of Education and ex-officio Deputy Prime Minister of South Korea, along with Hong Nam-ki under President Moon Jae-in from October 2018 to 9 May 2022
 Yoo Eun-mi, South Korean actress
 Yoo Eun-sook, South Korean voice actor
 Yoo Gun Hyung, South Korean songwriter
 Yoo Hae-jin, South Korean actor
 Yoo Hae-jung, South Korean actress
 Yoo Han-joon, South Korean outfielder for the KT Wiz
 Yoo Ha-na, South Korean actress
 Yoo Hee-kwan, South Korean starting pitcher for the Doosan Bears
 Yoo Ho-jeong, South Korean actress
 Yoo Ho-joon, South Korean footballer
 Yoo Hong-youl, South Korean football player who currently plays for TTM Lopburi in the Thai Division 1 League
 Yoo Hye-min, South Korean alpine skier
 Yoo Hye-ri, South Korean actress and model
 Yoo Hyeok-geun, South Korean rower
 Yoo Hyeonjong, South Korean novelist
 Yoo Hyeong-jong, South Korean footballer
 Yoo Hyun, South Korean footballer
 Yoo Hyun-goo, South Korean footballer
 Yoo Hyun-ji, South Korean handball player
 Yoo Hyun-young (better known as Hyun Young), South Korean entertainer
 Yoo Il-ho, former acting Prime Minister of South Korea, former Deputy Prime Minister, and former Minister of Finance
 Yoo In-na, South Korean actress and DJ
 Yoo In-soo, South Korean actor
 Yoo In-young (born Yoo Hyo-min), South Korean actress
 Yoo Ja-hyo, South Korean broadcaster and poet
 Yoo Jae-ha (1962–1987), South Korean singer-songwriter
 Yoo Jaehoon, former South Korean Director-General and the Controller of the Asian Infrastructure Investment Bank and former Korea Securities Depository
 Yoo Jae-hak, South Korean basketball coach for Ulsan Mobis Phoebus and Korean national team
 Yoo Jae-yong (1936-2009), South Korean novelist
 Yoo Jae-suk, South Korean comedian, host and television personality
 Yoo Jin-ryong, South Korean politician who formerly served as the Minister of Culture
 Yoo Jin-sun, South Korean former tennis player
 Yoo Jeong-yeon (better known as Jeongyeon), South Korean singer and member of girl group Twice
 Yoo Je-won, South Korean TV director
 Yoo Je-yoon, South Korean actor, model, and singer
 Yoo Ji-hoon, South Korean footballer who plays as a defender for Gyeongnam FC
 Yoo Ji-no, South Korean footballer
 Yoo Ji-tae, South Korean actor, film director and screenwriter
 Yoo Jong-hyun, South Korean footballer who plays as defender for FC Anyang in the K League 2
 Yoo Joon-young, South Korean footballer who plays as a midfielder for Bucheon FC 1995 in K League Challenge
 Yoo Jun-sang, South Korean actor and singer
 Yoo Jun-soo, South Korean footballer who plays for PT Prachuap in the Thai League 1
 Yoo Jung-ju, South Korean animator currently serving as a Democratic member of National Assembly
 Yoo Juhyun, South Korean novelist
 Yoo Jung-hyun, South Korean television personality and politician
 Yoo Jung-nam, South Korean swimmer
 Yoo Kee-heung, Korean football manager and former fullback player
 Yoo Ki-hong, South Korean former professional cyclist
 Yoo Ki-hyun, South Korean singer and member of boy group Monsta X
 Yoo Kwang-joon, South Korean former footballer
 Yoo Kyoung-youl, former South Korean footballer
 Yoo Man-kee, South Korean footballer who plays as midfielder for Goyang Hi FC in K League Challenge
 Yoo Mi, former South Korean tennis player
 Yoo Min-kyu, South Korean actor
 Yoo Min-hyeon, South Korean curler
 Yoo Myung-hee, South Korean politician and Minister for Trade
 Yoo Na-ul (stage name Naul), South Korean singer
 Yoo Nam-kyu, South Korea former table tennis player who competed in the 1988, the 1992, and in the 1996 Summer Olympics
 Yoo Nam-seok 7th President of the Constitutional Court of Korea
 Yu Oh-seong, South Korean actor
 Yoo Ok-ryul, South Korean former gymnast
 Yoo Sang-chul (1971–2021), South Korean football manager and player
 Yoo Sang-hee, South Korean former female badminton player
 Yoo Sang-joon, North Korean defector with South Korean citizenship
 Yoo Sang-yeol (1940-2022), South Korean public official, who served as Vice-Minister of Construction
 Yoo Se-hyung, South Korean actor
 Yoo Se-rye, South Korean actress
 Yoo Se-yoon, South Korean comedian and television comedy show host
 Yoo Seon-ho, South Korean singer, actor and model
 Yoo Seong-min, South Korean economist and politician (former member of the South Korean Parliament)
 Yoo Seung-ho, South Korean actor
 Yoo Seung-jun, Korean-American singer and actor
 Yoo Seung-yeon (better known as Gong Seung-yeon), South Korean actress
 Yoo Seung-woo, South Korean singer-songwriter and guitarist
 Yoo Si-ah (stage name YooA), South Korean singer and member of girl group Oh My Girl
 Yoo Song-hwa, South Korean politician previously served as the Director of the Chunchugwan Press Center at the Blue House under President Moon Jae-in
 Yoo Soo-Young (born Shū Kunimitsu, also known as Shoo), Japanese actress and singer
 Yoo So-young, South Korean actress and former member of girl group After School
 Yoo Soo-hyun, South Korean footballer
 Yoo Su-bin, South Korean actor
 Yoo Sun-hee, South Korean female speed skater
 Yoo Sun-young, South Korean professional golfer
 Yoo Sung-eun (better known as U Sung-eun), South Korean singer 
 Yoo Sung-je, South Korean ice hockey goaltender
 Yoo Sung-yeon, South Korean former judoka
 Yoo Won-chul, South Korean gymnast
 Yoo Won-jeong, paralympic boccia player
 Yoo Won-sang, South Korean baseball player
 Yoo Wook-jin, South Korean footballer
 Yoo Yang-joon, South Korean footballer
 Yoo Ye-bin, South Korean beauty pageant titleholder who was crowned Miss Korea 2013 and represented her country at the Miss Universe 2014 pageant
 Yoo Yeon-jung, South Korean singer, member of girl groups I.O.I and Cosmic Girls
 Yoo Yeon-mi, South Korean actress
 Yoo Yeon-seok (born Ahn Yeon-seok), South Korean actor
 Yoo Yeon-seong, South Korean professional badminton player
 Yoo Yeon-seung, South Korean footballer
 Yoo Yeon-soo (better known as Ha Yeon-soo), South Korean actress
 Yoo Yong-sung, South Korean retired badminton player
 Yoo Yoon-sik, South Korean volleyball player
 You Young, South Korean figure skater
 Yoo Young-chul, South Korean serial killer, rapist, and cannibal
 Yoo Young-ho, South Korean sculptor
 Yoo Young-jae, South Korean singer and actor, member of boy group B.A.P
 Yoo Young-jin, South Korean songwriter and record producer
 Yoo Young-sil, South Korean retired football player
 Yoo Youngkuk, South Korean artist in Korea's postwar art history (pioneer of Korean abstract art and Korean modern art)
 You Hee-yeol, South Korean singer-songwriter
 Yu In-chon, South Korean actor and former Minister of Ministry of Culture and Tourism
 Ryoo Ryong, South Korean scientist
 Ryoo Seung-bum, South Korean actor
 Ryoo Seung-wan, South Korean director
 Ryu Deok-hwan, South Korean actor
 Ryu Hwayoung, South Korean actress and singer, former member of girl group T-ARA
 Ryu Hyo-young, South Korean actress, model and rapper, former member of co-ed group Coed School and girl group F-ve Dolls
 Ryu Hye-young, South Korean actress and model
 Hyun-Jin Ryu, South Korean professional baseball player
 Ryu Hyun-kyung, South Korean actress
 Ryu Jin (born Im Yoo-jin), South Korean actor
 Ryu Jun-yeol, South Korean actor
 Ryu Sang-gu, also known as Deepflow, South Korean rapper and music producer 
 Ryu Se-ra, South Korean singer and former member of girl group Nine Muses
 Ryu Seung-Min, South Korean professional table tennis player
 Ryu Seung-ryong, South Korean actor
 Ryu Seung-soo, South Korean actor
 Ryu Seung-Woo, South Korean football player
 Ryu Shikun, South Korean professional Go player
 Ryu Si-won, South Korean actor and singer
 Ryu So-yeon, South Korean professional golfer
 Ryu Soo-young (born Eo Nam-seon), South Korean actor
 Ryu Su-jeong (better known as Sujeong), South Korean singer and member of girl group Lovelyz
 Ryu Sung-min, South Korean rapper 
 Rhyu Si-min, South Korean politician who served as the 44th Minister of Health and Welfare
 Ryu Jae-kuk, South Korean professional baseball pitcher for the Tampa Bay Devil Rays
 Aaron Yoo, Korean-American actor
 Christine Yoo, Korean-American writer, director, producer and filmmaker
 Christopher Yoo (chess player), Korean-American chess Grandmaster
 Christopher Yoo, professor of Law, Communication, and Computer and Information Science at the University of Pennsylvania Law School
 Daniel Yoo, Korean-American retired U.S. Marine Corps major general and former commander of United States Marine Corps Forces Special Operations Command
 Daniel Yoo, Korean-American former tennis player
 David Yoo, Korean-American fiction writer
 Esther Yoo, Korean-American violinist
 Jae Yoo, South Korean model
 John Yoo, Korean-born American professor of law at the University of California, Berkeley and former member of the U.S. Justice Department's Office of Legal Counsel
 Miri Yu, Zainichi Korean playwright, novelist, and essayist

 Richard Yoo, Korean-American entrepreneur, the co-founder/former CEO of the web hosting company Rackspace, and the founder/former CEO of web hosting company ServerBeach
 Scott Yoo, American conductor and violinist
 Yung Wook Yoo, South Korean pianist

See also  
 Liu (surname)
 Yu (Chinese name)

References

External links 
Yu Family History

Korean-language surnames
 
Surnames of Korean origin

vi:Liễu (họ người)
vi:Lưu (họ)